All the Rage may refer to:

Books
All the Rage (novel), a 2000 novel by F. Paul Wilson
All the Rage, novel by Courtney Summers (2015)
All the Rage, poetry criticism by William Logan (1998)
All the Rage, memoir by Ian McLagan (2000)
All the Rage, novel by Paul Magrs (2001)
All the Rage, play by Keith Reddin  (2006)

Film and TV
All the Rage (1997 film), a film by Roland Tec, released by Jour de Fete and Strand Releasing
All the Rage (2016 film), a documentary film directed by Michael Galinsky
It's the Rage (film), a 1999 film, also known as All the Rage
"All the Rage", an episode of the fourth season of Eureka

Music

Albums
All the Rage (General Public album), 1984
All the Rage (Blood on the Dance Floor album), 2011
All the Rage (EP), a 2004 EP by Cary Brothers
All the Rage (Kronos Quartet/Bob Ostertag album), 1993
All the Rage (Rhonda Vincent album), 2016

Songs
"All the Rage", a song by Elvis Costello, from the 1994 album Brutal Youth
"All the Rage", a song by Funeral for a Friend, from the 2005 album Hours
"All the Rage", a song by Allie X, from the 2017 album COLLXTION II: Unsolved
"All the Rage", a song by The Rolling Stones, from the 2020 deluxe edition of Goats Head Soup